The Ryhope Engines Museum is a visitor attraction in the Ryhope suburb of Sunderland, Tyne and Wear, England.

The Grade II* listed building is a popular landmark in Ryhope and is based at The Ryhope Pumping Station, operational for 100 years before closing in 1967. The building is more or less Jacobean in style with curving Dutch gables, and a tapering octagonal brick chimney. The historian of British industrial architecture Hubert Pragnell calls it a "cathedral of pistons and brass set within a fine shell of Victorian brickwork with no expense spared".

The volunteer-run museum contains two Victorian beam engines, which are kept in working order by members of the Ryhope Engines Trust. The site is owned by Northumbrian Water, successors to the Sunderland & South Shields Water Company which built the complex in the 1860s.

The engines are a near identical pair of double-acting compound rotative beam engines by the local North East firm R & W Hawthorn of Newcastle - 'possibly the finest pair of compound beam engines in Great Britain'. Each beam weighs 22 tons and each flywheel 18 tons. Both engines can be seen fully operational and in steam on various weekends and bank holidays each year.

The museum also contains three 1908 Lancashire boilers (two of which are still in regular service), a blacksmith's forge, a waterwheel, numerous steam engines and pumps, a replica plumber's shop, and many items associated with waterworks. In addition, visitors arriving in the engine house are now able to see to the bottom of the 250-foot well shaft by means of a viewing panel inserted in the floor.

The Liabilty (aka The Hitman's Apprentice)

See also 
 Tees Cottage Pumping Station for another working example of preserved waterworks engines in County Durham.

References

External links

 Official website

Grade II* listed buildings in Tyne and Wear
Preserved beam engines
Preserved stationary steam engines
Industry museums in England
Museums in the City of Sunderland
Steam museums in England
Former pumping stations
Blacksmith shops
Sunderland
Tyne & Wear Archives & Museums